Raša ( Chakavian: Aršija) is a  municipality in the inner part of the Raška Inlet in the south-eastern part of Istria, Croatia.

Situated in the valley of the Krapanski Potok (a tributary of the river Raša), near the former village of Krapan in 1785. 

Raša was built as a "new town" during 1936-1937 as part of Mussolini's urban colonization of Istria. Planned and designed according to the rationalist principles by architect, Gustavo Pulitzer-Finali from Trieste, Italy, the mining town is organized along a linear axis connecting the Upper and Lower Raša. Lower Raša consists of houses for ordinary miners set along two parallel streets while Upper Raša is organized  along three parallel streets with similar houses but slightly larger in size, designated for senior miners and supervisors. Smaller residential enclaves were organized throughout the elongated plan, one of which is "villette", a gated series of small urban villas designated for mining executives. 

The town centre connecting the Lower and Upper Raša included a large square with hotels, post office, supermarket, movie theatre, pharmacy, administrative offices and small arcaded shops. Overlooking the square is the church of Santa Barbara (patron saint of miners).  The single nave church is constructed in the shape of an overturned coal wagon while its bell tower resembles a miner's lamp. Centrally located are also the town hospital, football field, bocci terrain and swimming pool with diving tower and bowling alley. Decades after the mine's closure, today, Raša's appearance is part of a memory album of town planning, whereas the sound of coal wagons belongs to bygone days.

References

External links

Municipalities of Croatia
Populated places in Istria County
Italian fascist architecture